Harvest Radio is an English and iTaukei language Christian radio station in Fiji.The station broadcasts on the 89.8Mhz to the cities of Suva, Navua and Nausori. The station also broadcasts online.

It is operated by Christian Mission Fellowship, Fiji.

References

English-language radio stations
Radio stations in Fiji
Christian Radio in Fiji
Christian radio